KKLF (1700 AM) is a commercial radio station licensed to Richardson, Texas. Although the station's signal covers portions of the Dallas-Fort Worth Metroplex, it mainly serves areas of North Texas that are north and east of the Metroplex. This station broadcasts on the AM expanded band.  It is owned by Claro Communications, Ltd., with Gerald Benavides as the licensee.  It broadcasts a Tejano radio format, using the monikers "Jalapeño Radio". The DJs speak both Spanish and English.

KKLF transmits with a daytime power of 5,000 watts, & a nighttime power of 1,000 watts to avoid interfering with other stations on 1700 AM. The transmitter is off West Forest Grove Road in Lucas, Texas. KKLF is licensed by iBiquity for digital HD Radio transmission but is not currently transmitting a digital signal. Because the license to broadcast HD Radio is perpetual, the station could resume digital broadcasts at any time.

History

KKLF originated as the expanded band "twin" of an existing station on the standard AM band.

In 1951, the station moved to 950 kHz, and in 1954 its community-of-license was changed to Denison-Sherman. KDSX first aired a Top 40 format. It also spawned FM station KDSX-FM in 1967 (now KYDA in Azle, Texas).

On March 17, 1997 the Federal Communications Commission (FCC) announced that 88 stations had been given permission to move to newly available "Expanded Band" transmitting frequencies, ranging from 1610 to 1700 kHz, with KDSX authorized to move from 950 to 1700 kHz.

A construction permit for the expanded band station was assigned the call letters KTBK on June 1, 1998. The FCC's policy was that both the original station and its expanded band counterpart could operate simultaneously for up to five years, after which owners would have to turn in one of the two licenses, depending on whether they preferred the new assignment or elected to remain on the original frequency. It was ultimately decided to transfer full operations to the expanded band station, and on January 10, 2006 the license for original station on 950 kHz, after successively changing its call letters to KKLF, KYNG and KZRA, was cancelled.

In 2005, the station on 1700 AM changed its own call letters to KKLF, and also relocated to Richardson.

In 2011, Cumulus Media put KKLF and 11 other stations into a trust run by Scott Knoblauch (via Volt Radio, LLC) in preparation for Cumulus' acquisition of Citadel Broadcasting. As a result, the station's simulcast of KLIF ended in favor of an all-comedy format via the 24/7 Comedy Radio network. Originally, the current format would have launched on February 1, 2012, but it was delayed due to numerous missteps. KKLF officially changed formats to all-comedy on February 14.

In November 2013, KKLF was sold to Claro Communications through licensee Gerald Benavides, who previously owned DFW low-powered station KVFW-LD; the purchase was consummated on March 5, 2014 at a price of  million. On March 14, 2014, the station flipped from Comedy to Tejano music as "Kick 1700". In November 2016, the station switched formats and started broadcasting classic hits, sports and news in Spanish with a new name as Banda 13 Radio.

In an application for STA filed with the FCC, Claro stated that a residence is near the KKLF night tower. Because of the residence, KKLF has been granted an STA authorizing  unlimited operation.

References

External links

 DFW Radio/TV History

FCC History Cards for operation on 1220 and 950 kHz (covering 1947-1980 as KDSX)

Radio stations established in 1951
KLF
1951 establishments in Texas